Abby Lee (born 1971/72) has been a Republican member of the Idaho Senate representing District 9 since 2014.

Idaho Senate

Committee assignments
Finance
Heath and Welfare
Judiciary and Rules
Lee previously served on the Agriculture Affairs Committee from 2014 to 2016 and the Commerce and Human Resources Committee from 2014 to 2015.

Elections

Personal life
Lee and her husband Brian have two daughters. They reside in Fruitland, Idaho.

References

External links
 
 Campaign website

1970s births
Place of birth missing (living people)
Living people
Boise State University alumni
Brigham Young University alumni
Republican Party Idaho state senators
People from Fruitland, Idaho
Women state legislators in Idaho
21st-century American politicians
21st-century American women politicians
Year of birth missing (living people)